Catopsis minimiflora is a species in the genus Catopsis. This species is endemic to the State of Chiapas in southern Mexico.

References

minimiflora
Endemic flora of Mexico
Flora of Chiapas
Plants described in 1975